NGC 476 is a lenticular galaxy in the constellation Pisces. It is located approximately 261 million light-years from Earth and was discovered on November 3, 1864 by German astronomer Albert Marth.

See also  
 Lenticular galaxy 
 NGC 7007 
 List of NGC objects (1–1000)

References

External links 
 
 
 SEDS

Lenticular galaxies
Pisces (constellation)
0476
4814
Astronomical objects discovered in 1864